These are the late night schedules for the four United States broadcast networks that offer programming during this time period, from September 1989 to August 1990. All times are Eastern or Pacific. Affiliates will fill non-network schedule with local, syndicated, or paid programming. Affiliates also have the option to preempt or delay network programming at their discretion.

Legend

Schedule

Monday-Friday

The Pat Sajak Show was reduced to 60 minutes on October 30, 1989.

Saturday

Sunday

By network

ABC

Returning series
Nightline

New series
Into the Night Starring Rick Dees

CBS

Returning series
CBS Late Night
CBS News Nightwatch
The Pat Sajak Show

NBC

Returning series
Friday Night Videos
The George Michael Sports Machine
Late Night with David Letterman
Later With Bob Costas
Saturday Night Live
The Tonight Show Starring Johnny Carson

Fox

Returning series
Comic Strip Live

United States late night network television schedules
1989 in American television
1990 in American television